Manuchihr III (also spelled Minuchihr) was the Shirvanshah from 1120 to sometime after 1160. He was the son and successor of Afridun I.

He was born between 1091–1097. Between 1110–1117, he was married to the Georgian princess Tamar of the Bagrationi dynasty. Together they had four sons (Akhsitan I, Afridun II, Shahanshah and Farrukhzad I) and two unnamed daughters. Following Manuchihr III's death, Tamar went back to Georgia, where she became a nun.

During this period in Shirvanshah historiography, the names and family ties of the Shirvanshahs become exceedingly convoluted and uncertain, with the 17th-century Ottoman historian Munejjim-bashi (died 1702) only providing a incomplete of them, starting with Manuchihr, whom he calls "Shah Manuchihr ibn Kasran". Sources now start referring to the ruling Yazidi family as the "Kasranids" or "Khaqanids". Besides using the title of Shirvanshah, Manuchihr III also used the title of Khaqan-e Kabir ("Great Khan"), which was the inspiration behind the takhallus (pen name) of his eulogist, Khaqani.

It has been proposed that Manuchihr III may have divided his kingdom amongst his sons upon his death, due to coin mints demonstrating the coinciding reign of Akhsitan I, Shahanshah, Afridun II and his son Fariburz II. Afridun II and Fariburz II may have ruled in the western part of the kingdom, while coin mints of Shahanshah demonstrate that he was based in Shamakhi. However, the latter has also been suggested to have been the successor of Akhsitan I.

References

Sources 
 
 
 
 
 
 
 
 
 
 
 

12th-century Iranian people